The so-called Hamburg School of Art History (Hamburger Schule der Kunstgeschichte) was a school of art historians primarily teaching at the University of Hamburg, who were closely connected with the Kulturwissenschaftliche Bibliothek Warburg (KBW) at the Warburg Haus, Hamburg. Its main members were scholars such as Aby Warburg, Erwin Panofsky, Fritz Saxl and Ernst Cassirer, who had been schooled to see images as cultural documents and inculcated in the investigation of pictorial types.

The Hamburg School of Art History is celebrated for the theoretical interpretations of subject matter known as iconography and iconology. It was soon established and attracted brilliant students such as Edgar Wind, Hugo Buchthal, Adolf Katzenellenbogen, Walter Horn, Charles de Tolnay, Ludwig Heinrich Heydenreich, Lotte Brand Philip, William S. Heckscher, Klaus Hinrichsen, Liselotte Müller and H. W. Janson. The School had also an influence on Ernst Kris's psychological interests.

Further reading
 Emily J. Levine, "Sokrates an der Elbe? Erwin Panofsky und die Hamburger Schule der Kunstgeschichte in den 1920er Jahren". In Zeitgeschichte in Hamburg. Nachrichten aus der Forschungsstelle für Zeitgeschichte in Hamburg. Hamburg 2007, pp. 27–40.
 Emily J. Levine, Dreamland of Humanists: Warburg, Cassirer, Panofsky, and the Hamburg School. Chicago: University of Chicago Press, 2013.

References

Art history
University of Hamburg